Comin' On Strong is an album by saxophonist James Moody recorded in 1963 and released on the Argo label.

Reception

Jason Ankeny of Allmusic states: "Comin' on Strong ranks among James Moody's most challenging and rewarding sessions -- with its complex rhythms and mercurial tempos, the material is more like a series of obstacle courses than a collection of melodies, but Moody and his collaborators navigate the twists and turns with dexterity and grace".

Track listing 
All compositions by Tom McIntosh, except as indicated
 "In Other Words (Fly Me to the Moon)" (Bart Howard) - 4:40  
 "Dizzy" (James Moody) - 3:38  
 "Autumn Leaves" (Joseph Kosma, Johnny Mercer, Jacques Prévert) - 6:30  
 "Ole" (Dizzy Gillespie) - 4:39  
 "Sonnymoon for Two" (Sonny Rollins) - 4:46  
 "I've Grown Accustomed to Her Face" (Alan Jay Lerner, Frederick Loewe) - 3:05  
 "Zanzibar" (Esmond Edwards) - 4:01  
 "Please Send Me Someone to Love" (Percy Mayfield) - 5:34

Personnel 
 James Moody - tenor saxophone, flute
 Kenny Barron - piano (tracks 1-3, 5, 7 & 9), organ (tracks 4 & 6)
 George Eskridge - guitar
 Chris White - bass
 Rudy Collins - drums

References 

James Moody (saxophonist) albums
1963 albums
Albums produced by Esmond Edwards
Argo Records albums